The Mayor of Burao City is head of the executive branch of Burao City, the largest city in Togdheer Region of Somaliland. The current mayor is Abdirisaq Ibrahim Abdi (Hero), who was elected on 20 June 2021.

List of mayors

See also

 Mayor of Berbera
 Mayor of Las Anod
 Mayor of Hargeisa
 Mayor of Erigavo
 Mayor of Borama

References

Mayors of places in Somaliland